Montserrat Amédée (born 13 May 1996) is a French international rugby union player and rugby sevens player. She plays the position of club back with the Lionesses of the Bordeaux Stadium and in the French rugby union team1. 

In 2017, after a title of French Top 8 champion with her club, she was selected to compete in the 2017 Women's Rugby World Cup in Ireland where France finished in third place. With the French rugby sevens team, she reached the final of the 2018 Rugby World Cup Sevens.

Career 
She practiced gymnastics for thirteen years, then handball, before taking up rugby.

Montserrat Amédée played her first international match at the 2017 Women's Rugby World Cup in Ireland. She scored a total of 25 points, which put her in the lead in the number of points scored by a Frenchwoman during the competition, tied with Caroline Ladagnous. She also scored a try in the first game against Japan.

The following season, she was named in the sevens team of the World Rugby Women's Sevens Series, with the Australians Evania Pelite and Emma Tonegato, the Russian Baizat Khamidova, the Spaniard Patricia García and the New Zealanders Portia Woodman and Michaela Blyde. In July, she competed in the 2018 Rugby Sevens World Cup. The French team managed to qualify for the final, beating one of the two main favorite teams in the semi-finals, the Australian team on the score of 19 to 12 with a try in stoppage time. In the final, the French lost to the New Zealand team with a score of 27 to 0.

References 

1996 births
Rugby sevens players
Rugby union players
Living people